James Frederick Knobloch (born April 28, 1953, in Jackson, Mississippi, United States), known as J. Fred Knobloch or Fred Knoblock, is an American country singer-songwriter.

Career
Prior to his solo career, Knobloch had been a member of Let's Eat, a 1970s rock band. Knobloch was signed to Scotti Brothers Records in 1980 when he released the song "Why Not Me", which he wrote along with Carson Whitsett. It reached number 18 on the Billboard Hot 100 singles chart, number 30 on the country chart, and spent two weeks at number one on the Adult Contemporary chart. Later that year he released a duet with Susan Anton, "Killin' Time", which hit number 28 on the Hot 100 and went top ten on the country chart. He had later country hits with "Memphis" and "I Had It All".

In 1986, Knobloch became a member of S-K-O with Paul Overstreet and Thom Schuyler. Knobloch continued to perform as a singer and songwriter into the 2000s. He and Jelly Roll Johnson released the album Live at the Bluebird Cafe in 2000.

His songs have been recorded by The Everly Brothers, Faith Hill, Chely Wright, George Strait, The Wilkinsons, Trisha Yearwood, Confederate Railroad, John Anderson and Sawyer Brown among others.

In 2012, he was inducted into the Mississippi Musicians Hall of Fame.

Discography

Albums

Singles

References

1953 births
Living people
American country singer-songwriters
Singer-songwriters from Mississippi
Musicians from Jackson, Mississippi
S-K-O members
Country musicians from Mississippi
Scotti Brothers Records artists
Bellaphon Records artists